Planned London Underground stations may mean stations on the London Underground that have been:
Planned to open in the future
Planned in the past and cancelled

Disambig-Class London Transport articles